Toxonotus is a genus of fungus weevils in the beetle family Anthribidae. There are about 13 described species in Toxonotus.

Species
These 13 species belong to the genus Toxonotus:

 Toxonotus bidens Valentine, 1955
 Toxonotus bipunctatus (Schaeffer, 1904)
 Toxonotus comatus Poinar & Legalov, 2016
 Toxonotus cornutus (Say, 1831)
 Toxonotus fascicularis (Schoenherr, 1833)
 Toxonotus inaequalis (Jordan, 1904)
 Toxonotus lividus (LeConte, 1876)
 Toxonotus notatus Valentine
 Toxonotus penicellatus (Schaeffer, 1904)
 Toxonotus ruscarius Valentine
 Toxonotus triguttulatus Frieser & R., 2004
 Toxonotus trituberculatus Wolfrum, 1953
 Toxonotus vagus (Horn, 1894)

References

Further reading

External links

 

Anthribidae
Articles created by Qbugbot